Ben Hawkins may refer to:
Benjamin Hawkins (1754–1818), U.S. statesman
Benjamin Waterhouse Hawkins (1807–1894), English sculptor and natural history artist
 Ben Hawkins (Carnivàle), the protagonist in Carnivàle
Ben Hawkins (American football) (1944–2017), American football player